Politics in Jamaica takes place in the framework of a representative parliamentary democratic constitutional monarchy. The 1962 Constitution of Jamaica established a parliamentary system whose political and legal traditions closely follow those of the United Kingdom. As the head of state, King Charles III - on the advice of the Prime Minister of Jamaica - appoints a governor-general as his representative in Jamaica. The governor-general has a largely ceremonial role. Jamaica constitutes an independent Commonwealth realm.

The Constitution vests executive power in the cabinet, led by the Prime Minister. Executive power is exercised by the government. Legislative power is vested both in the government and in the Parliament of Jamaica.

A bipartisan joint committee of the Jamaican legislature drafted Jamaica's current Constitution in 1962. That Constitution came into force with the Jamaica Independence Act, 1962 of the Parliament of the United Kingdom, which gave Jamaica political independence. Constitutional safeguards include freedom of speech, freedom of the press, freedom of worship, freedom of movement, and freedom of association.

The judiciary operates independently of the executive and the legislature, with jurisprudence based on English common law.

Legislative branch

Parliament is composed of an appointed Senate and an elected House of Representatives. Thirteen Senators are nominated on the advice of the prime minister and eight on the advice of the Leader of the Opposition; a two-thirds super-majority of both chambers is needed for major constitutional amendments. General elections must be held within five years of the forming of a new government.

The prime minister may ask the governor-general to call elections sooner, however. The Senate may submit bills, and it also reviews legislation submitted by the House. It may not delay budget bills for more than one month or other bills for more than seven months. The prime minister and the Cabinet are selected from the Parliament. No fewer than two nor more than four members of the Cabinet must be selected from the Senate.

Political parties and elections

 Jamaica Labour Party
 Marcus Garvey People's Political Party
 National Democratic Movement
 New Nation Coalition 
 People's National Party

Executive branch

The 1962 Constitution established a parliamentary system based on the United Kingdom's Westminster model. As head of state, King Charles III appoints a governor-general, on the advice of the prime minister, as his representative in Jamaica. The governor-general's role is largely ceremonial. Executive power is vested in the King, but exercised mostly by the Cabinet of Jamaica; led by the prime minister, currently Andrew Holness.

Current composition

General Elections February 25, 2016

Judicial branch

The judiciary also is modelled on the British system. The Court of Appeal is the highest appellate court in Jamaica. Under certain circumstances, cases may be appealed to Britain's Judicial Committee of the Privy Council. Jamaica's parishes have elected councils that exercise limited powers of local government.

Firearms offences, including possession of unlicensed guns and ammunition, are tried before a dedicated Gun Court established in 1974.  The Gun Court hears cases in camera and practices jury trial only for cases of treason or murder.  All other cases are tried by resident magistrates or justices of the Supreme Court of Jamaica.

Administrative divisions
Jamaica is divided in 14 parishes: Clarendon, Hanover, Kingston, Manchester, Portland, Saint Andrew, Saint Ann, Saint Catherine, Saint Elizabeth, Saint James, Saint Mary, Saint Thomas, Trelawny, Westmoreland.

Regulatory services
Responsibility for water and sanitation policies within the government rests with the Ministry of Water and Housing, and the main service provider is the National Water Commission. An autonomous regulatory agency, the Office of Utilities Regulation (OUR), approves tariffs and establishes targets for efficiency increases, and also oversees the telecommunications industry.

Foreign relations

Jamaica has diplomatic relations with most nations and is a member of the United Nations, The Commonwealth and the Organization of American States. Historically, Jamaica has had close ties with the UK. Trade, financial, and cultural relations with the United States are now predominant. Jamaica is linked with the other countries of the English-speaking Caribbean through the Caribbean Community (CARICOM), and more broadly through the Association of Caribbean States (ACS).

See also

List of Jamaican Ministers of State
Republicanism in Jamaica

References